Anna Kulkina (born 19 March 1986) is a Kazakhstani synchronized swimmer. She competed in the women's duet at the 2012 Summer Olympics with Aigerim Zhexembinova.

References 

1986 births
Living people
Kazakhstani synchronized swimmers
Olympic synchronized swimmers of Kazakhstan
Synchronized swimmers at the 2012 Summer Olympics
Asian Games medalists in artistic swimming
Artistic swimmers at the 2006 Asian Games
Artistic swimmers at the 2010 Asian Games
Sportspeople from Almaty
Medalists at the 2006 Asian Games
Medalists at the 2010 Asian Games
Asian Games bronze medalists for Kazakhstan